Satya Naidu or Sathyanarayanan Sudarsan Naidu (born 9 November 1992) is the first Hindu member of Seychelles National Assembly. He is also the youngest Parliamentarian of the 7th National Assembly. He was elected from the St. Louis constituency in the 2020 Seychellois parliamentary election.

Early life 
Naidu was born on the 9 November 1992. His family traced their origin to the  Mayavaram district of Tamil Nadu in India, which his grandfather left in 1917?

Education
Satya studied Law in from the APIIT Law School, Sri Lanka in 2016 and then did an LLB (Hons) with the Staffordshire University in collaboration with the APIIT Law School, Sri Lanka. He is currently doing a Post-Graduate Certificate in Legal Practice with the University of Seychelles.

Political career
From the age of 17, Sathya began advocating for Seychelles National Party (Linyon Demokratik Seselwa). According to him, it is the President Wavel Ramkalawan's fighting spirit and the love for the people that inspired him to pursue politics.

He became the Chairperson of the Seychelles National Youth Union and then became the Executive Committee Member of the Seychelles National Party (Linyon Demokratik Seselwa) from 2012 to 2014.

In the 2020 Seychellois parliamentary election, he won the St. Louis constituency after getting 60% of votes. He is currently a Member of the Bills Committee.

On the 28th of March 2022, he got elected as the Executive Committee member of Linyon Demokratik Seselwa in a heavily contested election amongst other party stalwarts. 

On the 7th of May 2022, he was elected to lead the United Cities and Local Governments of Africa’s (UCLG Africa) network of locally elected youth of Africa for the continent’s eastern region.

See also
Indo-Seychellois

References

1992 births
Living people
Seychellois politicians
Seychellois people
Seychellois Hindus
Seychellois people of Indian descent